Acleris caliginosana is a species of moth of the family Tortricidae. It is found in North America, where it has been recorded from Alberta, British Columbia, California, Colorado, Idaho, Maine, Montana, New Brunswick, Nova Scotia, Ontario, Quebec, Washington and Wisconsin.

The wingspan is 24–29 mm. The ground colour of the forewings is deep purple or grey brown and the hindwings are mottled. Adults have been recorded on wing nearly year round.

The larvae feed on Alnus incana, Alnus rubra and Betula papyrifera.

References

Moths described in 1863
caliginosana
Moths of North America